Hermán Solíz Salvatierra (born 14 July 1982) is a Bolivian former football defender who last played for Universitario de Sucre. Solíz was a member of the Bolivia national football team in Copa América 2004.

Club titles

External links

 

 

1982 births
Living people
Bolivian footballers
Bolivia international footballers
Association football defenders
2004 Copa América players
Club Blooming players
The Strongest players